is a Japanese footballer currently playing as a centre back for Shonan Bellmare.

Career statistics

Club
.

Notes

References

External links

1997 births
Living people
Sportspeople from Mie Prefecture
Association football people from Mie Prefecture
Nihon University alumni
Japanese footballers
Association football defenders
J1 League players
Shonan Bellmare players